Totalitarian democracy is a term popularized by Israeli historian Jacob Leib Talmon to refer to a system of government in which lawfully elected representatives maintain the integrity of a nation state whose citizens, while granted the right to vote, have little or no participation in the decision-making process of the government. The phrase had previously been used by Bertrand de Jouvenel and E. H. Carr, and subsequently by F. William Engdahl and Sheldon S. Wolin.

J. L. Talmon

J. L. Talmon's 1952 book The Origins of Totalitarian Democracy discusses the transformation of a state in which traditional values and articles of faith shape the role of government into one in which social utility takes absolute precedence. His work is a criticism of the ideas of Jean-Jacques Rousseau, whose political philosophy greatly influenced the French Revolution, the growth of the Enlightenment across Europe, as well the overall development of modern political and educational thought. In The Social Contract, Rousseau contends that the interests of the individual and the state are one and the same, and it is the state's responsibility to implement the "general will".

The political neologism messianic democracy (also political Messianism) also derives from Talmon's introduction to this work:
Indeed, from the vantage point of the mid twentieth century the history of the last hundred and fifty years looks like a systematic preparation for the headlong collision between empirical and liberal democracy on the one hand, and totalitarian Messianic democracy on the other, in which the world crisis of to-day consists.

Differences in democratic philosophy 

The philosophy of totalitarian democracy, according to Talmon, is based on a top-down view of society, which sees an absolute and perfect political truth to which all reasonable humans are driven. It is contended that not only is it beyond the individual to arrive at this truth independently, it is his duty and responsibility to aid his compatriots in realizing it. Moreover, any public or private activities that do not forward this goal have no useful purpose, sap time, money and energy from those that do, and must be eliminated. Thus economic and social endeavors, which tend to strengthen the collective, are seen as valuable, whereas education and religion, which tend to strengthen the individual, are seen as counterproductive. "You cannot be a citizen and a Christian at the same time," says Talmon, referring to Rousseau's arguments, "for the loyalties clash."

In his paper Advances in Chinese Social Sciences (2001), Mao Shoulong, a professor of Public Policy at Renmin University of China, takes a different position. He posits that totalitarian democracy, or what he terms "equality-oriented democracy," is founded on the idea that it is possible, and necessary, that the complete rights and freedoms of people ought not be held hostage to traditions and social arrangements. Mao recognizes that the term "totalitarian" has a connotation attached to it, used as it was by Giovanni Gentile to apply to the Italian fascist government led by Benito Mussolini. He sees the proponents of liberal democracy (or "Western" democracy) as holding a negative attitude to the word and believing that force is not an appropriate way to achieve a goal no matter the value of that goal. He prefers the term "freedom-oriented democracy" to describe such a political entity.

Fundamental requirements

A totalitarian democracy, says Talmon, accepts "exclusive territorial sovereignty" as its right. It retains full power of expropriation and full power of imposition, i.e., the right of control over everything and everyone. Maintenance of such power, in the absence of full support of the citizenry, requires the forceful suppression of any dissenting element except what the government purposely permits or organizes. Liberal democrats, who see political strength as growing from the bottom up (cf: "grass roots"), reject in principle the idea of coercion in shaping political will, but the totalitarian democratic state holds it as an ongoing imperative.

A totalitarian democratic state is said to maximize its control over the lives of its citizens by using the dual rationale of general will (i.e., "public good") and majority rule. An argument can be made that in some circumstances it is actually the political, economic, and military élite who interpret the general will to suit their own interests. Again, however, it is the imperative of achieving the overarching goal of a political nirvana that shapes the vision of the process, and the citizen is expected to contribute to the best of his abilities; the general is not asked to guide the plow, nor is the farmer asked to lead the troops.

It can approach the condition of totalitarianism; totalitarian states can also approach the condition of democracy, or at least majoritarianism. Citizens of a totalitarian democratic state, even when aware of their true powerlessness, may support their government. When Germany started World War II, the Nazi government had the support of the majority of Germans and it was not until much later, after Germany's losses began to mount, that support for Hitler began to fade. Joseph Stalin was practically worshipped by hundreds of millions of Soviet citizens, many of whom have not changed their opinion even today, and his status ensured his economic and political reforms would be carried out.  The term has also more recently been applied to South Africa under the rule of the African National Congress.

Cold War and socio-economic illustrations

The period of the Cold War following WWII saw great ideological polarization between the so-called "Free World" and the Communist states.  In the East, religious and intellectual repression was met with increasing resistance, and the Hungarian revolt of 1956 and Alexander Dubček's Prague Spring in 1968 are two well-known acts of defiance. The Tienanmen Square Massacre was a similar example of repressive violence leading to hundreds of deaths. In the United States, alleged Communists and Communist sympathizers were investigated by Senator Joseph McCarthy in what later generations would recall as a "witch hunt"; many accused Communists were forced out of their jobs or their reputations were scandalized. Shortly after the time of Talmon's book, the Vietnam War brought active hostility between elements in the U.S. government and political factions within the American people. One faction insisted that the U.S. government did not represent them in levying war in Southeast Asia, protesting the war, as well as undemocratic or oligarchical power-structures within U.S. society; this faction occasionally saw repression from the government, such as through "dirty tricks" aimed at "subversives" by the FBI in COINTELPRO. This conflict within U.S. society rose to violence during the protests and riots at the Democratic National Convention of 1968 in Chicago, Illinois, and in the Kent State Massacre, where four anti-war protesters were shot dead by U.S. National Guard forces.

One concept fundamental to both "liberal" and "totalitarian" democracy is that of liberty. According to Talmon, totalitarian democracy sees freedom as something achieved only in the long term, and only through collective effort; the political goal of ultimate order and ultimate harmony brings ultimate freedom. In addressing every aspect of the lives of its citizens, the totalitarian democratic state has the power to ensure that all material needs are met from cradle to grave, and all that is required of the citizen is to carry out his role, whatever it may be, to the best of his ability. Liberal democracy, on the other hand, posits freedom as something that can and should be achieved by the individual in the short term, even at the expense of things such as material well-being, and sees as an element of this freedom a "freedom from government" wherein the individual is able to exercise "freedom" in his own terms to the extent that they do not contravene the law. Proponents of both kinds of democracy argue that their particular approach is the best one for the citizens of their respective countries.

It is Mao Shoulong's contention that "equality-oriented democracy recognises the value of freedom but holds that [it] can't be attained by individual efforts," but rather, by collective efforts. He argues that while equality-oriented democracy stresses the value of equality over individual freedoms, the reverse is true for freedom-oriented democracy, and in each case, the state will move either to ensure equality by limiting individual freedom, or to ensure individual freedom by giving up equality. Some critics of this view may argue that equality and individual freedoms are inseparable, and that one cannot exist (or be sustained) without the other. Other critics argue that equality can only be ensured by continuous coercion, while ensuring individual freedom only requires force against coercive individuals and external states.

Shoulong also holds that a law is not valid if it does not have the approval of the public. Laws passed by the state do not require approval by the citizen on a case-by-case basis, and it can be easily argued that some laws currently in place in some countries purporting to be liberal democracies do not have the approval of the majority of citizens. For one, Rousseau argued in "The Social Contract", that in the stereotypical liberal democracy, individuals are politically "free" once every Parliamentary term, or every two to four years, when they vote for their representatives, in their General Election or on Election Day. Yet, Rousseau fails to consider that the state is not a total institution within the liberal democracies, and that the freedom of the citizen in between the elections is the freedom of the citizen to live their life in pursuit of their own happiness, subject to the law made by their elected representatives, who are, in turn, subject to popular pressure, public protest, petition, recall, referendum, initiative, and ultimately, electoral defeat if they fail to heed the views of those they represent. This is in contrast to a totalitarian democracy, with the state as a total institution, where the individual is truly not free without constant participation in their "democratic" government; and thus, the individual in the totalitarian democracy must be "forced to be free" if the totalitarian democracy is not to become a totalitarian oligarchy.

F. William Engdahl and Sheldon S. Wolin 
Engdahl and Wolin add some new dimensions to the analysis of totalitarianism. In Full Spectrum Dominance: Totalitarian Democracy and the New World Order, Engdahl focuses on the American drive to achieve global hegemony through military and economic means. According to him, U.S state objectives have led to internal conditions that resemble totalitarianism: "[it is] a power establishment that over the course of the Cold War has spun out of control and now threatens not only the fundamental institutions of democracy, but even of life on the planet through the growing risk of nuclear war by miscalculation"

Wolin, too, analyzes the symbiosis of business and public interests that emerged in the Cold War to form the tendency of what he calls "inverted totalitarianism":

While exploiting the authority and resources of the state, [inverted totalitarianism] gains its dynamic by combining with other forms of power, such as evangelical religions, and most notably by encouraging a symbiotic relationship between traditional government and the system of "private" governance represented by the modern business corporation. The result is not a system of codetermination by equal partners who retain their respective identities but rather a system that represents the political coming-of-age of corporate power.

Elsewhere, in an article entitled "Inverted Totalitarianism" Wolin cites phenomena such as the lack of involvement of citizens in a narrow political framework (due to the influence of money), the privatization of social security, and massive increases in military spending and spending on surveillance as examples of the push away from public and towards private-controlled government. Corporate influence is explicit through the media, and implicit through the privatization of the university. Furthermore, many political think-tanks have abetted this process by spreading conservative ideology. Wolin states: "[With] the elements all in place...what is at stake, then, is nothing less than the attempted transformation of a tolerably free society into a variant of the extreme regimes of the past century"

Slavoj Žižek comes to similar conclusions in his book Welcome to the Desert of the Real. Here he argues that the war on terror served as a justification for the suspension of civil liberties in the US, while the promise of democracy and freedom was spread abroad as the justification for invading Iraq and Afghanistan. Since Western democracies are always justifying states of exception, they are failing as sites of political agency.

See also 
Anti-democratic thought
Authoritarianism
Autocracy
Electocracy
Falangism
Authoritarian democracy
Guided democracy
Illiberal democracy
Inverted totalitarianism
National anarchism
Neocameralism
Outline of democracy
Post-democracy
Ruscism
Soft despotism
Sovereign democracy 
Tyranny of the majority

Notes

External links 
 Paradigm: from totalitarian democracy to libertarian polyarchy
 Criticizing Totalitarian Democracy: Herbert Marcuse and Alexis de Tocqueville  (Zvi Tauber)
 J. L. Talmon, The Origins of Totalitarian Democracy - Introduction (1952)
 John Courtney Murray, The Church and Totalitarian Democracy

Authoritarianism
Historiography
Philosophy of history
Totalitarianism
Types of democracy
Works about totalitarianism